Sir Henry Morgan (c. 1635 – 1688) was a Welsh privateer and Admiral of Caribbean Fleet; Lieutenant Governor of Jamaica 1675–83.

Henry Morgan may also refer to:

Actors
Henry Morgan (humorist) (1915–1994), American radio and television personality
Henry Morgan (actor) (1915–2011), American film and TV performer whose stage name became Harry Morgan in 1956

Clergymen
Henry Morgan (bishop) (before 1500–1559), Welsh lawyer and last Roman Catholic Bishop of St David's
Henry Morgan (minister) (1825–1884), American author and Methodist pastor in Boston
Henry Morgan (academic) (1830–1912), English academic ordained in 1859
Henry Morgan (priest) (1871–1947), Welsh Archdeacon of Bangor

Public officials
Henry Morgan (of Llandaff) (before 1580–1632), Welsh member of House of Commons in 1601
Henry Morgan-Clifford (1806–1884), English Liberal Party Member of Parliament
Henry James Morgan (1842–1913), Canadian civil servant, historian and editor
Henry A. Morgan (1861–1942), Arizona pioneer, merchant, first mayor of Willcox, Arizona
Henry Sturgis Morgan Jr. (1924–2011), American lawyer and rear admiral
Henry Coke Morgan Jr. (born 1935), American federal judge for Eastern District of Virginia

Others
Henry Morgan (merchant) (1819–1893), Scottish-Canadian (Quebec) department store tycoon
Henry Sturgis Morgan (1900–1982), American banker and co-founder of Morgan Stanley
Henry Morgan (cricketer) (1907–1987), Irish first-class cricketer

See also
Henry Morgan Dockrell (1880–1955), Irish politician elected to Dáil Éireann and Seanad Éirean
Henry Morgan Taylor (1889–1955), New Zealand rugby player and cricketer
Harry Morgan (disambiguation)